The 1962–63 Cincinnati Bearcats men's basketball team represented University of Cincinnati. The team's head coach was Ed Jucker.

Regular season
In the Crosstown Shootout, Cincinnati beat Xavier by a score of 72–61. The match was held at the Cincinnati Gardens and drew 14,133.

NCAA basketball tournament
Mideast 
Final Four
Cincinnati 80, Oregon State 46
Loyola, Illinois 60, Cincinnati 58

Rankings

Awards and honors

NBA Draft

References

Cincinnati
Cincinnati Bearcats men's basketball seasons
NCAA Division I men's basketball tournament Final Four seasons
Cincinnati
Cincinnati Bearcats men's basketball
Cincinnati Bearcats men's basketball